Chougule is a surname. Notable people with the surname include:

Deepak Chougule (born 1984), Indian cricketer
Devendra Chougule (born 1975), Indian actor
Dnyanraj Chougule, Indian politician
Sangram Chougule (born 1979), Indian bodybuilder
Vijay Chougule, Indian politician